Hongqiao Subdistrict (Shanghainese: ghon1jiau1 ka1dau2) is a subdistrict of Changning District in the western part of Shanghai's urban core. , it has 16 residential communities under its administration. It can be accessed by Songyuan Road Station of the Shanghai Metro Line 10.

See also 
 Shanghai Hongqiao International Airport
 List of township-level divisions of Shanghai

References

External links 

Township-level divisions of Shanghai
Changning District